The 2012 Pacific-Asia Junior Curling Championships were held from January 27 to February 2 in Jeonju City, South Korea.  The Pacific Junior Championships acted as the Pacific Zone qualifiers for the 2012 World Junior Curling Championships. The teams competed in a double round robin, and the top three teams moved on to the playoffs. The winners of the tournament, China's junior men and Japan's junior women, will compete at the 2012 World Junior Championships in Östersund, Sweden.

Men

Teams
The teams are listed as follows:

Round-robin standings
Final round-robin standings

Round-robin results
All times are listed in Korea Standard Time (UTC+9).

Draw 1
Saturday, January 28, 10:00

Draw 2
Saturday, January 28, 16:00

Draw 3
Sunday, January 29, 10:00

Draw 4
Sunday, January 29, 16:00

Draw 5
Monday, January 30, 10:00

Draw 6
Monday, January 30, 16:00

Draw 7
Tuesday, January 31, 10:00

Draw 8
Tuesday, January 31, 16:00

Draw 9
Wednesday, February 1, 10:00

Draw 10
Wednesday, February 1, 16:00

Playoffs

Semifinal
Thursday, February 2, 9:00

Final
Thursday, February 2, 14:30

Women

Teams
The teams are listed as follows:

Round-robin standings
Final round-robin standings

Round-robin results
All times are listed in Korea Standard Time (UTC+9).

Draw 1
Saturday, January 28, 10:00

Draw 2
Saturday, January 28, 16:00

Draw 3
Sunday, January 29, 10:00

Draw 4
Sunday, January 29, 16:00

Draw 5
Monday, January 30, 10:00

Draw 6
Monday, January 30, 16:00

Draw 7
Tuesday, January 31, 10:00

Draw 8
Tuesday, January 31, 16:00

Draw 9
Wednesday, February 1, 10:00

Draw 10
Wednesday, February 1, 16:00

Playoffs

Semifinal
Thursday, February 2, 9:00

Final
Thursday, February 2, 14:30

References

External links

2012 Pacific-Asia Junior Curling Championships 

Pacific-Asia Junior Curling Championships, 2012
Pacific-Asia Junior Curling Championships
Sports competitions in Jeonju
International curling competitions hosted by South Korea 
Pacific-Asia Junior Curling Championships